This a partial list of prehistoric lakes. Although the form of the names below differ, the lists are alphabetized by the identifying name of the lake (e.g., Algonquin for Glacial Lake Algonquin). YBP = Years Before Present.

North America

Endorheic basins
 Estancia Valley, Central New Mexico, United States
 Lake Estancia, glacial paleolake that once hosted cutthroat trout
 Plains of San Agustín, Central New Mexico, United States
 Lake San Agustín, present day site of the Very Large Array
 Tularosa basin, Southern New Mexico, United States
 Lake Otero
 Lake Lucero; Once much larger, the present day lake is an alkali lake and the main source of gypsum for White Sands National Park, the largest gypsum dune field in the world.
 Great Basin
 Mono Lake Lee Vining, California. Rapidly shrinking due to Los Angeles Department of Water and Power damming tributaries.

Atlantic Drainage
 St. Lawrence River drainage, i.e., the Great Lakes 
 Champlain Sea; 11,800 – 8,200 YBP on the lower St. Lawrence, from Ottawa River to the Gulf of St. Lawrence
 Lake Ontario basin: 8,400 YBP
 Early Lake Ontario; 8,700 – 11,800 YBP
 Lake Admiralty; 10,000 YBP
 Lake Frontenac; 12,000 – 11,000 YBP covering the Ontario basin and to the northeast up the St. Lawrence Valley covering the low lands north to the Ottawa River and Montreal.
 Glacial Lake Iroquois; 13,000 – 10,500 YBP and covered all of the Ontario basin and southward across central New York, reaching to the Finger Lakes.
Finger Lakes of New York plus 12 minor lakes
Dansville Lake in the Canaseraga valley
Scottsburg Lake in the Conesus valley
Naples Lake in the Canandaigua valley
Hammondsport Lake in the Keoka valley.
Watkins Lake in the Seneca valley
Ithaca Lake in the Cayuga valley
Lake Erie (8,400 YBP) basin
 Early Lake Erie; 11,800 – 8,700 YBP in Ohio, Ontario, Michigan, Pennsylvania, and New York and located in the Erie basin
 Lake Lundy; 2,000 YBP in Ohio, Ontario, Pennsylvania, and New York
 Lake Tonawanda; 10,000 YBP in western New York
 Lake Wayne; ended by 12,000 YBP in Ohio, Pennsylvania, and New York, expanding from Lake Warren to cover most of the Erie basin
 Lake Warren; 12,700 YBP in Ohio, Pennsylvania, and New York, covering southern portion of the basin
 Lake Whittlesey; 13,000 – 12,700 YBP in Ohio, Ontario, Michigan, and Pennsylvania. It covered the western half of the Erie basin and north over southwest Ontario to the tip of Lake Huron.
 Lake Arkona; 13,600 – 13,200 YBP in Ohio, Ontario, Michigan, and Pennsylvania. Covered two-thirds of the Erie basin, north across southwest Ontario to include the southern tip of Lake Huron, the ‘thumb’ of Michigan and low lands south and west of Saginaw Bay.
 Lake Maumee; 14,000 – 13,000 YBP in Ohio, Ontario and Michigan.  The western basin reaching to Fort Wayne, Indiana.
 Lake Rouge in Michigan south of Detroit.
 Lake St. Clair and the Detroit River:
 Early Lake St. Clair: 12,500 – 5,500 YPB in Lake St. Clair; Michigan and Ontario.
 Lake Huron basin
 Later Lake Saginaw in Saginaw Bay on the lower peninsula of Michigan.
 Nipissing Great Lakes; 5,500 - 4,500 YBP
Lake Nipissing; 8,400 – 5,500 YBP formed as the water bodies in the Superior and Huron basins merged across Sault Ste. Marie around 8,400 YBP and then merged with the Michigan basin around 7,800.
Lake Stanley-Hough; 8,700 YBP, the water levels had risen to connect both Lake Stanley and Lake Hough into a single body of water.
Lake Stanley; 9,000 YBP covered only the northern and eastern portion of the main Huron basin with channels into Lake Hough.
Lake Hough; 9,000 YBP covered Georgian Bay, Ontario.
 Glacial Lake Algonquin; 9,000 – 7,000 YBP
 Lake Stanley; to 10,000 YBP  
 Lake Saginaw; 13,500 YBP 10,300 YBP along the southern shore of Saginaw Bay and the low lands to the southwest.
 Lake Michigan (1,500 YBP) basin
 Nipissing Great Lakes: 5,500 - 4,500 YBP
Lake Nipissing; 8,400 – 5,500 YBP formed as the water bodies in the Superior and Huron basins merged across Sault Ste. Marie around 8,400 YBP and then merged with the Michigan basin around 7,800.
 Glacial Lake Algonquin; 9,000 – 7,000 YBP
 Lake Chippewa; 10,700 – 7,500 YBP, covered the lowest elevations in the Lake Michigan basin forming a linear lake in the middle, linked by a narrow proto-Straits of Mackinac and the Mackinac Falls to Lake Stanley. 
 Lake Chicago; 14,000 – 11,000 YBP along the southern shore and growing slowly northward.
Lake Superior basin
 Precursor Lakes, before the formation of basin wide bodies of water.
 Lake Ashland
 Lake Brule
 Lake Nemadji
 Lake Ontonagon
 Lake St. Louis
 Nipissing Great Lakes: 8,400 – 5,500 YBP formed as the water bodies in the Superior and Huron basins merged across Sault Ste. Marie around 8,400 YBP and then merged with the Michigan basin around 7,800.; - 5,500;  - 4,500 YBP
 Lake Houghton; 8,700 – 8,000 YBP covered the Superior basin in Ontario, Minnesota, Wisconsin, and Michigan.
 Fenton Lake; 9,500 YBP occupied a shallow basin in the eastern side of Lake Superior after Lake Minong had shrunk below rock sills internal to the lake basin.
 Lake Minong; 10,300 – 9,800 YBP  covering most of the modern Superior basin.
Post-Duluth Lake; 10,600 YBP along the Wisconsin and Michigan shore, reaching less than halfway across the basin.
 Lake Duluth; 11,500 – 11,000 YBP in the western half of the Superior basin.
 Glacial Lake St. Louis occupied St. Louis Bay at the southern tip of modern Lake Superior.
 Lake Keweenaw; 12,500 – 12,000 YBP in the western Superior basin.
 Atlantic Ocean
 Lake Albany in the valley of the Hudson River.
 Glacial Lake Block Island off the south coast of Rhode Island, west of Block Island.
 Glacial Lake Cape Cod in Massachusetts.
 Lake Colebrook on the border of Vermont and New Hampshire, crossing into Quebec.
 Lake Coos on the border of Vermont and New Hampshire.
 Lake Connecticut; 20,000 – 18,000 YBP, covered Long Island Sound.
 Glacial Lake Hitchcock; 15,000 YBP in the valley of the Connecticut River.
 Glacial Lake Nantucket Sound in Massachusetts.
 Glacial Lake Narragansett covered Narragansett Bay in Rhode Island.
 Lake Merrimack in New Hampshire in the Merrimack River valley
 Lake Passaic; 19,000 – 14,000 YBP in New Jersey
 Glacial Lake Rhode Island off the south coast of Rhode Island, east of Block Island
 Lake Sciota; in the eastern Poconos Pennsylvania.
 Lake Stowe; 15,000 YBP in central Vermont.
 Lake Vermont in Vermont, New York states, and the province of Quebec.
 Lake Winooski in Vermont.
 Lubbock Lake in Texas (see Lubbock Lake Landmark)

Via the Gulf of Mexico
 Mississippi River basin
 Glacial Lake Calvin in southeast Iowa
Illinois River basin
Lake Baroda in Michigan on the lower St. Joseph River.
 Lake Dowagiac in Michigan on the lower Dowagiac River, now a branch of the St. Joseph River which now flows into Lake Michigan. 
 Lake Madron in Michigan at the junction of the St. Joseph River and the Dowagiac River.
 Lake Kankakee; 13,600 – 13,200 YBP  
 Glacial Lake Ottawa in Illinois on the upper Illinois River.
 Glacial Lake Pontiac in Illinois on the lower Vermillion River.
 Glacial Lake Wauponsee in Illinois at the headwaters of the Illinois River.
 Lake Watseka in Illinois on the Iroquois River.
 Ohio River basin
 Lake Monongahela, along the Allegheny, Monongahela and upper Ohio Rivers.
 Glacial Lake Tight, named for William G. Tight along the Ohio and West Virginia border.
 Upper Mississippi River basin
 Lake Upham north of Duluth, Minnesota.
 Lake Aitkin along the Mississippi River near Grand Rapids, Minnesota.
 Lake Minnesota at the great bend in the Minnesota River at Mankato, Minnesota
 Glacial Lake Baraboo, communicating with Glacial Lake Wisconsin here
 Glacial Lake Grantsburg, draining through the St. Croix River,
Lake Oshkosh; 13,600 - YBP. on the central Wisconsin River.
 Glacial Lake Wisconsin; 18,000 – 14,000 YBP in Wisconsin along the Wisconsin River.
 Missouri River basin
 Glacial Lake Great Falls; 17,000 – 13,000 YBP in Montana near Great Falls, Montana.
 Lake Cut Bank in Montana on the Marias River near Cut Bank.
 Lake Chouteau in Montana
 Lake Musselshell in Montana on the Musselshell River.
 Lake Jordan in Montana
 Lake Circle in Montana,
 Lake Glendive in Montana on the Yellowstone River, upstream from its junction with the Missouri River.
 Lake Crow Flies High in North Dakota between Williston and New Town.
 Lake McKenzie in North Dakota from the Great Bend, south to the South Dakota border.
 Rio Grande basin
 Lake Alamosa in Colorado
 Lake Cabeza de Vaca in extreme southern New Mexico, United States, and northern Chihuahua, Mexico; once the ultimate destination of the Rio Grande until it was captured by the Pecos River
 Pluvial Lake Palomas in the same area, but fed by the now-endorheic Mimbres River; now a major source of sand for the Médanos de Samalayuca

Arctic Drainage
 MacKenzie River basin
Lake MacKenzie in the Northwest Territories.
 Lake McConnell; 11,800 – 8,400 YBP
 Lake Agassiz; 12,875 – 8,480 YBP in Manitoba and Ontario, stretching south in the James River valley of North Dakota and Minnesota.
Modern:  Lake Winnipeg, Cedar Lake (Manitoba), Lake Winnipegosis, Lake Manitoba,  Lake of the Woods 
 Lake Edmonton in Alberta
 Lake Peace in Alberta and British Columbia
 Lake Regina
 Lake Hind in southwestern Manitoba
 Lake Souris across North Dakota and Manitoba
 Hudson Bay drainage
 Tyrell Sea; 7,000 – 6,000 YBP
 Lake Ojibway; 8,500 – 8,200 YBP
 Lake Antevs
 Lake Nakina in Ontario, east of Lake Nipigon

Pacific Drainage
 Pacific Ocean:
 Lake Atna drained from present-day Copper River Basin
 Glacial Lake Bretz drained north from present-day Puget Sound in Washington
 Lake Cahuilla in Southern California at the Salton Sea and today's cities of Indio, Mexicali, and El Centro, CA
Glacial Lake Hood formed in the southern hook of the Hood Canal and drained south through Glacial Lake Russell at Tacoma and the Black River Valley to the Chehalis River.
Lake Modoc formed on the Klamath River, at Upper Klamath Lake, Lower Klamath Lake and Tule Lake
Lake Nisqually preceded Lake Russell and waters, west of Tacoma, including the Narrows.
Lake Puyallup was on the middle and upper Puyallup River and preceded Lake Tacoma.
 Glacial Lake Russell drained south from present-day Puget Sound in Washington.
 Glacial Lake Sammamish preceded Lake Sammamish, draining into Glacial Lake Russell’s bay in the Lake Russell’s bay in the Lake Washington basin east of Seattle. 
Lake Skokomish drained the southeast flank of the Olympic Mountains in the Skokomish River basin.
 Lake Tacoma was at the southern end of the Vashon Glacier in Puget Sound covering Commencement Bay, extending south up the Puyallup River valley. Washington basin east of Seattle.
 Glacial Lake Snoqualmie in Washington State
 Columbia River basin:
 Lake Allison; 15,000 – 13,000 YBP in the Willamette Valley of Oregon.
 Lake Canadian on the Washington/Oregon border above the Dalles
 Lake Condon; 15,000 – 13,000 YBP on the Columbia River on the Washington/Oregon border above the Dalles and below Wallula Gap.
 Lake Lewis; 16,000 YBP in central Washington, new Yakima.
 Glacial Lake Columbia in central Washington State
 Glacial Lake Spokane in eastern Washington near Spokane.
 Lake Missoula; 15,000 – 13,000 YBP in western Montana.
 Great Basin of California, Nevada, Utah, Oregon & Idaho:
 Lake Lahontan; 12,700 – 9,000 YBP in Nevada, California and Oregon.
 Lake Alvord in Oregon and Nevada
 Lake Amboy in California 
 Lake Bonneville; 32,000 – 14,500 YBP in Utah and Idaho and Nevada.
 Lake Carpenter in Nevada
 Lake Chewaucan in Oregon
 Lake Clover in Nevada
 Lake Dixie in Nevada
 Lake Franklin in Nevada
 Lake Harney-Malheur in Oregon
 Lake Klamath in California and Oregon
 Lake Madeline in California
 Lake Manly; 186,000 – 10,000 YBP, covered Death Valley
 Lake Mojave in California 
 Lake Owens in California 
 Lake Panamint in California 
 Lake Railroad in Nevada
 Lake Russell in Nevada and California
 Lake Searles in California 
 Lake Spring in Nevada
 Lake Steptoe in Nevada
 Lake Tecopa
 Lake Thompson
 Lake Toiyabe in Nevada
 Lake Tulare in California 
 Lake Tule in California
 Lake Waring in Nevada

Europe 
 Lake Komi, a proglacial lake formed in the vicinity of the present-day Russian Komi Republic
 White Sea Ice Lake, freshwater period of the White Sea
 Baltic Ice Lake, freshwater period of the Baltic Sea
 Ancylus Lake, freshwater period of the Baltic Sea
 Lake Harrison in the Midlands in England
 Lake Lapworth in Shropshire in England
 Lake Orcadie of the Old Red Sandstone, Scotland
 Lake Pickering  between the North York Moors and the Yorkshire Wolds in England
 Ebro endorheic lake system, in the Ebro Basin, (Spain)
 Duero endorheic lake system, in the Duero Basin, (Spain)
 Gjende Lake in the Jotunheimen mountains of Norway
 Zechstein Sea covering all of central and Northern Europe (Saltwater)

South America  
 Altiplano Cundiboyacense
 Lake Humboldt, Pleistocene lake on the Bogotá savanna
 Altiplano Boliviano
 Cabana, a lake level highstand of Lake Titicaca
 Lake Escara
 Inca Huasi
 Mataro, a lake level highstand of Lake Titicaca
 Lake Minchin
 Ouki
 Sajsi
 Salinas
 Lake Tauca
 Cancosa paleolake
Patagonia
 Great Tehuelche Paleolake

Asia 
 Mundafan, Arabia
 West Siberian Glacial Lake
 Lake Bandung in Indonesia
 Lake Tengger

Africa 
 Lake Makgadikgadi in the Kalahari Desert in Africa
 Lake Ptolemy
 Chad Basin what is now Lake Chad
 Lake Congo, what is now the Congo Basin
 Lake Suguta

Oceania 
 Lake Carpentaria, Australia
 Lake Bungunnia in the Murray Basin, Australia
 Eromanga Sea in the Eromanga Basin, Australia
 Lake Manuherikia, Central Otago, New Zealand
 Lake Walloon, Lake Winton, and Lake Dieri, Australia, of which the modern Lake Eyre is a remnant

See also 

 List of endorheic basins
 List of lakes

References 

Prehistoric
Lakes
Glacial lakes